Mojtaba Sarasiaei (born 23 Sep 1979) is an Iranian football manager who currently is Head coach in Fajr Sepasi.

He played as a defender for Payam Paykan and Aboumoslem in Azadegan League and Persian Gulf Pro League until the year 2014.

Managerial Statics

References

Living people
Iranian football managers
Shahr Khodro F.C. managers
People from Mashhad
F.C. Aboomoslem players
Paykan F.C. players
Payam Mashhad players
Iranian footballers
1979 births
Association footballers not categorized by position